David Page (and those similarly spelled) may refer to:

 David Page (geologist) (1814–1879), Scottish science writer
 David Page (musician) (1960–2016), Indigenous Australian music director
 David C. Page (born 1956), American professor of biology
 David Perkins Page (1810–1848), American educator and writer, first head of the New York State Normal School
 Dave Page (born 1940), American former history professor, now cobbler
 David R. Paige (1844–1901), U.S. Representative